The 1998–99 Irish Cup was the 119th edition of Northern Ireland's premier football knock-out cup competition. The last match was played on 20 April 1999. The final did not take place this year, for only the third time in the competition's history.

Glentoran were the defending champions after winning their 17th Irish Cup last season, with a 1–0 win over Glenavon in the 1998 final. This season they reached the sixth round, where they were defeated 2–1 by Cliftonville.

Portadown won the cup for the second time, after Cliftonville were disqualified from the competition for fielding an ineligible player in the semi-final replay against Linfield. Linfield were not permitted to replace Cliftonville in the final, so Portadown were awarded the cup without the final being played.

Fifth round

|}

Replays

|}

Sixth round

|}

Quarter-finals

|}

Replays

|}

Semi-finals

|}

Replay

|}

Final
On 29 April 1999, Cliftonville were disqualified from the competition for fielding an ineligible player in the semi-final replay against Linfield. The player in question had played for a junior club in an earlier round and was therefore ineligible. However, Linfield's protest came more than 48 hours after the tie (the usual deadline for protests), and as a result the IFA did not allow them to take Cliftonville's place in the final. Portadown were therefore awarded the cup without the final taking place.

References

1998–99
1998–99 domestic association football cups
1998–99 in Northern Ireland association football